Andrew J. Conrad is an American geneticist who heads Verily, a life sciences division of Alphabet Inc. As its chief executive officer, Conrad has recruited a multidisciplinary team of  chemists, doctors, engineers, behavioral scientists and data scientists to research health and disease.

Early life 
Conrad grew up in Malibu, California and enjoyed surfing there.

Education 
Conrad graduated with a B.S. in neurobiology and a Ph.D. in cell biology from the University of California, Los Angeles (UCLA) in the late 1980s.

Career 
In 1991 Conrad co-founded the National Genetics Institute (NGI) along with Mike Aicher. He served as its chief scientist and helped grow it into one of the largest genetics laboratories in the world. In 2000 LabCorp bought NGI for $65 million.

With the money earned from the sale of NGI, Conrad built a vacation home on the Lānaʻi island of Hawaii. On June 2, 2000, Conrad and Hollywood actress Courtney Thorne-Smith impulsively got married but the two split 7 months later.

At an art auction in Lānaʻi, Conrad met David H. Murdock, chairman and owner of Dole Food Company, and also owner of Lānaʻi island. Murdock came to trust Conrad and eventually gave him board membership on companies he controlled: Castle & Cooke, Dole Food Company and NovaRx. Conrad invested his money with Murdock and his son, Justin.

In 2005, Conrad helped set up the North Carolina Research Campus (NCRC), a life sciences research center in Kannapolis, North Carolina. Murdock donated $700 million to NCRC as its founder. As its chief scientific advisor, Conrad attracted prominent scientists and companies to NCRC to develop products focused on agriculture, food, nutrition, and health.

In November 2006 Conrad founded the California Health and Longevity Institute inside the Four Seasons Westlake Village, California in partnership with Murdock and Wellpoint.

In March 2013 Conrad joined the life sciences unit of Google X after 22 years at NGI.

In June 2013 Murdock started the process to take the Dole Food Company private and appointed Conrad at the head of a four-person special committee of independent directors to approve a deal. Murdock initially offered $12 a share in cash, a price that the committee found too low. Murdock ultimately closed the deal at $13.50 but shareholders sued anyway. In 2015 they were awarded $148 million in damages while  Conrad was found to have acted with integrity, and was not held liable.

In August 2015 the life sciences unit of Google X was spun out as its own company under the Alphabet Inc. with Conrad as its CEO. In December 2015, the company changed its name from Google Life Sciences to Verily.

In January 2023, Stephen Gillett became the new CEO of Verily, while Conrad shifted roles to become the executive chairman amid a corporate restructuring.

Awards 
Conrad was named one of the Top 25 Most Influential People in Biopharma 2015 by FierceBiotech.

Publications 
Conrad has more than eighty-five publications in scientific and medical journals.

Personal life 
Conrad is an avid surfer and has a casual dressing style. He is married to Haylynn Cohen, a model, with whom he has two children.

References

External links 

 Andrew Conrad speaks at the WSJD Live conference.

Living people
1964 births
People from Los Angeles
University of California, Los Angeles alumni
American geneticists
Google people
Alphabet Inc. people
American technology chief executives
People from Malibu, California
Scientists from California